Ali Raza Berni (born 16 February 1981) is a Pakistani former first-class cricketer who played for Islamabad between 1997 and 2002.

References

External links
 

1981 births
Living people
Pakistani cricketers
Islamabad cricketers
Cricketers from Rawalpindi